The ISRO Inertial Systems Unit (IISU) is a research and development unit of the Indian Space Research Organisation located in Vattiyoorkavu, Thiruvananthapuram that specialises in inertial sensors and systems in satellite technology. Its
specialized fields include the fields of launch vehicle inertial systems, spacecraft inertial systems, inertial sensors evaluation and simulation, inertial system production, inertial systems electronic production, reliability and quality assurance and advanced inertial systems group.

External links
https://web.archive.org/web/20090725061959/http://www.isro.org/rep2005/Organisation.htm

Indian Space Research Organisation facilities
Research institutes in Thiruvananthapuram
Year of establishment missing